The 2017–18 Toledo Rockets women's basketball team represents University of Toledo during the 2017–18 NCAA Division I women's basketball season. The Rockets, led by tenth year head coach Tricia Cullop, play their home games at Savage Arena, as members of the West Division of the Mid-American Conference. They finished the season 18–15, 8–10 in MAC play to finish in fourth place in the West Division. They lost in the first round of the MAC women's tournament to Kent State. They received an at-large bid to the Women's National Invitation Tournament where they defeated Wright State in the first round before losing to Michigan State in the second round.

Previous season
They finished the season 25–9, 12–6 in MAC play to finish in a tie for third place in the West Division. They defeated Kent State, Buffalo and Northern Illinois to win the MAC Tournament to earn an automatic trip to the NCAA women's tournament for the first time since 2001. They lost to Creighton in the first round.

Roster

Schedule
Source:

|-
!colspan=9 style=| Exhibition

|-
!colspan=9 style=| Non-conference regular season

|-
!colspan=9 style=| MAC regular season

|-
!colspan=9 style=| MAC Women's Tournament

|-
!colspan=9 style=| WNIT

See also
 2017–18 Toledo Rockets men's basketball team

References

Toledo
Toledo Rockets women's basketball seasons
Toledo